Los Diez Pintores Concretos (The Ten Concrete Painters) was a mid 20th Century Cuban avant-garde visual art collective centered upon the strong emphasis on geometric abstraction at the core of Concretism. The group existed from 1959 until 1961 and its members included Pedro de Oraá, Loló Soldevilla, Sandú Darié, Pedro Carmelo Álvarez López, Wifredo Arrcay Ochandarena, Salvador Zacarías Corratgé Ferrera, Luis Darío Martínez Pedro, José María Mijares, Rafael Soriano López, and José Ángel Rosabal Fajardo. The group's activities were centered on the Galeria Color-Luz, founded in Havana by Soldevilla and de Oraá in 1957. Their approach to geometric abstraction was part of a broader resurgence of concretism in Latin American in the late 1940s and 1950s; through Darié, Los Diez had links to the Argentine Grupo Madí. Though Los Diez "affirm[ed] their work as a transformative intervention into - not a reflection of, nor an escape from - the world," the group "struggled to advance their social manifesto." 

Los Diez was the subject of the exhibition Concrete Cuba at the David Zwirner Gallery displayed at the gallery's London location in 2015 and their New York City venue in 2016. An elaborate  accompanying catalogue was produced and features an interview with Pedro De Oraá, then  last surviving member of the group, by Lucas Zwirner.

References

Cuban artist groups and collectives
Cuban painters
Concrete art